The Solicitor of the Treasury position was created in the United States Department of the Treasury by an act of May 29, 1830 , which changed the name of the Agent of the Treasury.

Function
The Solicitor of the Treasury served as legal advisor to the department, and examined Treasury officers' official bonds and related legal documents.  He also supervised all legal proceedings involving the collection of debts due the United States.  In addition, he established regulations to guide customs collectors, issued distress warrants against delinquent revenue collectors or receivers of public money, and administered lands acquired by the United States in payment for debts.

Predecessor agencies
 Comptroller of the Treasury (1789–1817)
 First Comptroller of the Treasury (1817–20)
 Agent of the Treasury (1820–30)

Position abolished
The position of Solicitor of the Treasury was abolished by an act of May 10, 1934 (48 Stat. 759).

Successor agency
The Solicitor of the Treasury's position was succeeded by the Office of the General Counsel for the Department of the Treasury.

List of Solicitors of the Treasury
Virgil Maxcy of Maryland, from May 29, 1830 

Henry D. Gilpin of Pennsylvania, from June 16, 1837 

Matthew Birchard of Massachusetts, from January 16, 1840 

Charles B. Penrose of Pennsylvania, from March 17, 1841 

Seth Barton of Louisiana, from March 25, 1845

Ransom H. Gillet of New York, from May 27, 1847 

John C. Clark of New York, from October 31, 1849

George F. Comstock of New York, from November 15, 1852 

Gilbert Rodman of Pennsylvania, from March 30, 1853 (interim)

John Carroll LeGrand of Maryland, from April 8, 1853 

Albert Constable of Maryland, from May 2, 1853 

Farris B. Streeter of Pennsylvania, from June 3, 1853 

Junius Hillyer of Georgia, from December 1, 1857 

Benjamin F. Pleasants of Kentucky, from February 13, 1861 (interim) 

Edward Jordan of Ohio, from March 28, 1861

E. C. Banfield of Massachusetts, from April 15, 1869 

Bluford Wilson of Illinois, from June 22, 1874 

George F. Talbot of Maine, from July 24, 1876 

Kenneth Rayner of North Carolina, from July 1, 1877

Henry S. Neal of Ohio from July 2, 1884

Alexander McCue of New York, 1885 to 1888

Charles S. Cary of New York, 1888 to 1889

William P. Hepburn of Iowa, 1889 to 1893

Felix A. Reeve of Tennessee, 1893 to 1897

Maurice D. O'Connell of Iowa, 1897 to 1910

William T. Thompson of Nebraska, 1910 to 1913

Felix A. Reeve of Tennessee (acting solicitor), 1914

Lawrence Becker of Indiana, 1915 to 1922

Richard Randolph McMahon of West Virginia, 1922 to 1926

Robert J. Mawhinney of Maryland, 1926 to 1932

References

Federal government of the United States
United States Department of the Treasury
1830 establishments in the United States